Statistics of the Scottish Football League in season 1929–30.

Scottish League Division One

Scottish League Division Two

See also
1929–30 in Scottish football

References

 
Scottish Football League seasons